João Lacerda Filho (11 February 1929 – 29 June 2011), commonly known as Barbatana, was a Brazilian professional football coach and player. During his playing days, he was a midfielder, and played for clubs in Minas Gerais and Rio de Janeiro. As a coach, he worked mainly with Atlético Mineiro, but also coached many other clubs in Brazil and the Indonesia national under-23 team.

Career

Player
Barbatana first played in a club in his hometown Ponte Nova as a condition to work in the city's sugar refinery. The team was called Sport Club Ana Florentina, but soon he was seen by and went to play for Metalusina, a club from Barão de Cocais. After a friendly between Metalusina and Atlético Mineiro played in the city, Barbatana moved to the latter in 1950, taking part in that year's Campeonato Mineiro and the 1950 Atlético Mineiro European tour. He was not under contract, and was sent back to Metalusina with the promise of being signed. However, Bangu also noticed Barbatana and signed him. He spent two seasons with Bangu, before returning to Minas Gerais to play for Villa Nova in 1953, where he was coached by Yustrich. The manager moved to Porto in 1955 and wanted to take the player with him, but Barbatana chose to sign with América Mineiro. He spent two seasons at América, before returning to rivals Atlético Mineiro, where he ended his career.

Manager
After retiring from playing, Barbatana spent nine years away from football, until he was called up by an Atlético Mineiro director, who invited him to coach the club's youth squads. Barbatana agreed, initially to a three-month experience period, but remained in the position for years, discovering players like Lola, Humberto Ramos, Marcelo Oliveira, Toninho Cerezo, Paulo Isidoro and Reinaldo, who would become an Atlético Mineiro legend. Barbatana then had stints as Atlético's caretaker manager in the 1960s and early 1970s, and in 1975, he coached Goiás and CEUB.

He became manager of Atlético Mineiro's first squad in 1976, where he was reunited with former youth squads graduates Oliveira, Cerezo, Isidoro and Reinaldo, leading the team to an undefeated runner-up season in the 1977 Campeonato Brasileiro Série A. He left the club in 1978, and spent a period managing Atlético's rivals Cruzeiro in 1979. Barbatana then manager Sport Recife in 1981, and returned to Atlético in 1982. He also managed the Indonesia national under-23 team, Náutico, Al-Hilal FC, Nacional (AM) and América Mineiro during his career, which ended in 1992 once again with Atlético Mineiro. He is the fourth manager with most matches for Atlético, with 227.

Death 
Barbatana died of Alzheimer's disease on 29 June 2011, aged 82.

Honours

Player 
Atlético Mineiro
Campeonato Mineiro: 1958

Manager 
Atlético Mineiro
Campeonato Mineiro: 1976
Campeonato Brasileiro Série A: 1977 (runner-up)
Copa dos Campeões Brasileiros: 1978

References

External links 
Barbatana at Galo Digital 

1929 births
2011 deaths
Brazilian footballers
Association football midfielders
Clube Atlético Mineiro players
Bangu Atlético Clube players
América Futebol Clube (MG) players
Clube Atlético Mineiro managers
Cruzeiro Esporte Clube managers
América Futebol Clube (MG) managers
Sport Club do Recife managers
Clube Náutico Capibaribe managers
Goiás Esporte Clube managers
Brazilian football managers
Deaths from dementia in Brazil
Deaths from Alzheimer's disease